Anelaphus niveivestitus is a species of beetle in the family Cerambycidae. It was described by Charles Schaeffer in 1905.

References

Anelaphus
Beetles described in 1905